The 32nd Wisconsin Infantry Regiment was a volunteer infantry regiment that served in the Union Army during the American Civil War.

Service
The 32nd Wisconsin Infantry was organized at Camp Bragg in Oshkosh, Wisconsin, and mustered into service on September 25, 1862. The regiment left Wisconsin for Memphis, Tennessee, on October 30 and moved through Mississippi, Alabama, Georgia, the Carolinas, Virginia and Washington D.C.

It participated in the Siege of Atlanta, Sherman's March to the Sea, the Battle of Bentonville and the surrender of the Confederate army.

Casualties
The 32nd Wisconsin suffered 1 officer and 26 enlisted men killed in action or who later died of their wounds, plus another 3 officers and 86 enlisted men who died of disease, for a total of 112 fatalities.

Commanders
 Colonel James Henry Howe (September 25, 1862July 6, 1864) resigned.  After the war was appointed United States district judge for the Eastern District of Wisconsin
 Colonel Charles Henry De Groat (July 6, 1864July 8, 1865) mustered out with the regiment and received an honorary brevet to brigadier general.

Notable members
 George F. Caldwell was a private in Co. D.  He transferred to the 16th Wisconsin Infantry Regiment in 1865. After the war he became a Wisconsin state legislator.
 Samuel Abbott Ferrin was a hospital steward.  He later served as an assistant surgeon in the 44th Wisconsin Infantry Regiment.  After the war he became a Wisconsin state legislator.
 Simon Lord was surgeon of the regiment.  Previously served as assistant surgeon in the 13th Wisconsin Infantry Regiment.  After the war he became a Wisconsin state senator.
 Henry Markham was second lieutenant of Co. G and was wounded at Rivers' Bridge.  After the war he became the 18th governor of California and a U.S. congressman.
 David G. Williams was enlisted in Co. F and rose to the rank of sergeant.  After the war he became a Wisconsin state legislator.

See also

 Addie L. Ballou
 List of Wisconsin Civil War units
 Wisconsin in the American Civil War

References

External links
The Civil War Archive

Military units and formations established in 1862
Military units and formations disestablished in 1865
Units and formations of the Union Army from Wisconsin
1862 establishments in Wisconsin